USS LST-350 was one of 390 tank landing ships (LSTs) built for the United States Navy during World War II.

LST-350 was laid down on 10 November 1942 at the Norfolk Navy Yard; launched on 7 February 1943; sponsored by Mrs. C. M. Terry; and commissioned on 13 February 1943.

Service history
During World War II, LST-350 was assigned to the European theater and participated in the Sicilian occupation (July 1943), Salerno landings (September 1943), and Invasion of Normandy (June 1944).

LST-350 was redesignated landing craft repair ship USS Chandra (ARL-46) on 25 May 1945, but the redesignation was subsequently cancelled. The ship was decommissioned on 26 May 1945 and struck from the Naval Vessel Register on 12 March 1946. On 2 December 1946 she was sold to the Suwannee Steam Ship Company of Charleston, South Carolina and converted for merchant service.

LST-350 earned three battle stars for World War II service.

See also
 List of United States Navy LSTs

References

 
 

World War II amphibious warfare vessels of the United States
Ships built in Norfolk, Virginia
1943 ships
LST-1-class tank landing ships of the United States Navy